The 1998 Armenian Cup was the seventh edition of the Armenian Cup, a football competition. In 1998, the tournament had 16 participants, out of which only one was a reserve team.

Results

Preliminary round
The match was played on 6 March 1998.

|}

First round
The first legs were played on 10 March 1998. The second legs were played on 15 March 1998.

|}

Quarter-finals
The first legs were played on 10 and 11 April 1998. The second legs were played on 25 April 1998.

|}

Semi-finals
The matches were played on 9 May 1998.

|}

 Yerevan advanced to the final after the draw.

Final

See also
 1998 Armenian Premier League

External links
 1998 Armenian Cup at rsssf.com

Armenian Cup seasons
Armenia
Armenian Cup, 1998